Nankivell Observatory, named after the late Garry Nankivell, a master optical craftsman, is situated in the Wairarapa, New Zealand. It is to become incorporated into the Matariki Research Observatory, now under development by members of the Phoenix Astronomical Society (NZ) (PAS).

The Nankivell Observatory houses an 8" Schmidt Camera with a 6" guide refractor built by Garry Nankivell.

External links
 Matariki Research Observatory
 Phoenix Astronomical Society website

Astronomical observatories in New Zealand
Buildings and structures in the Wairarapa